Darent Valley Hospital is a 478-bed, acute district general hospital in Dartford, Kent, England. The hospital has an Emergency Department. The hospital is managed by the Dartford and Gravesham NHS Trust.

History

The hospital, which was built to replace Joyce Green Hospital, stands on the site of the former Darenth Park Hospital, founded by the Metropolitan Asylums Board as "Darenth School" in 1878. The Regional Health Board agreed to close Darenth in 1973, but the last patients did not leave until 1988. The vast Victorian complex was then demolished.

The new buildings were procured under a Private Finance Initiative contract in 1997, the first hospital project to use this form of procurement. They were designed by Nightingale Paulley Associates and built by Carillion at a cost of £94 million. The new hospital, which replaced the services previously provided at West Hill Hospital, Dartford and Joyce Green Hospital, Dartford, was officially opened by Alan Milburn, Secretary of State for Health, on 14 December 2000.

A new on-site heart centre was opened on 2 January 2007.

See also
 List of hospitals in England

References

Hospital buildings completed in 2000
Hospitals in Kent
Dartford
NHS hospitals in England